Clouse is a surname. Notable people with the surname include:

Mark Clouse (born 1968), American businessman
Michael J. Clouse, American record producer and songwriter 
Robert Clouse (1928–1997), American film director and producer
Robert Clouse (professor) (1931–2016), American religious scholar
Steve Clouse (born 1956), American politician
Wynne F. Clouse (1883–1944), American politician